Filosofisk Tidskrift is a quarterly Swedish-language academic journal covering all areas of philosophy while avoiding contributions that require special technical prerequisites. It was established in 1980 and the editor-in-chief is Lars Bergström (Stockholm University).

Abstracting and indexing
PhilPapers has abstracted 98 papers that appeared in the journal between 1980 and 2015.

See also
List of philosophy journals

References

External links
 

Philosophy journals
Publications established in 1980
Quarterly journals
Swedish-language journals
Magazines published in Stockholm
1980 establishments in Sweden